Tarpley is an unincorporated community in Bandera County, Texas, United States. According to the Handbook of Texas, the community had a population of 30 in 2000. It is part of the San Antonio Metropolitan Statistical Area.

History
A post office named Hondo Cañon opened in 1878 near Williams Creek. In 1899, it was moved further south and renamed Tarpley after the postmaster's son. In 1900, a store and blacksmith were attached to the post office and in 1902 a Baptist church opened. By 1925, the community had a population of 25, rising to 40 in 1984. In 1990 and 2000, Tarpley's population was 30.

In recent years, Tarpley has become known as the site of the famous Mac & Ernie's Roadside Eatery.

Although it is unincorporated, Tarpley has a post office, with the zip code 78883.

Geography
Tarpley is located at the junction of Farm to Market Roads 462 and 470 on Williams Creek, about 12 miles southwest of Bandera in south-central Bandera County.

Climate
The climate in this area is characterized by hot, humid summers and generally mild to cool winters.  According to the Köppen Climate Classification system, Tarpley has a humid subtropical climate, abbreviated "Cfa" on climate maps.

Education
Tarpley's school opened in 1902. The Bandera Independent School District serves area students.

References

Unincorporated communities in Texas
Unincorporated communities in Bandera County, Texas
Greater San Antonio